Kendall Hailey is an American writer and autodidact.  She graduated from high school a year early, at age 16, to pursue unschooling and wrote about her experiences in the book, The Day I Became an Autodidact and the Advice, Adventures, and Acrimonies that Befell Me Thereafter (Delacorte Press, and Bantam Dell Publishing Group, New York, 1988). The book details first her decision to leave formal education, and follows her as she sets out to read everything ever published.

She is a daughter of playwright Oliver Hailey and novelist Elizabeth Forsythe Hailey.

References

External links
 Review and quotes from Hailey's book.
 Book review
 Bill's Best People profile, with photo

American autobiographers
Year of birth missing (living people)
Living people
Women autobiographers
20th-century American women writers
20th-century American non-fiction writers
American women non-fiction writers
21st-century American women